The Invasion of Val d'Aran, known under the code name Operación Reconquista de España ("Operation Reconquest of Spain"), was a military operation launched in October 1944 by the Unión Nacional Española (antifrancoist) (es) (UNE). In October 1944, with the Spanish Civil War over and the Axis powers in World War II in retreat, guerrilla fighters loyal to the Republic tried to conquer Val d'Aran in Catalonia and establish a provisional Republican government presided over by Juan Negrín in order to later overthrow the dictatorship of Francisco Franco. The invasion, led by communist militant and French resistance member Vicente López Tovar, managed to overrun a number of Civil Guard outposts and take over several hamlets in the high areas of Arán, but was eventually repelled by the Francoist army, led by General José Moscardó, the defender of the Alcázar during the civil war. 

Moscardó established his headquarters at Vielha, the main administrative center of the valley, and, supported by heavy artillery, made impossible to the insurgents to advance through the Port de la Bonaigua and then into the lower lands. The guerrillas were also beaten off at Salardú, where they suffered a number of casualties.

According to historian Geneviève Dreyfus-Armand, the UNE was a "structure of a large alliance, (which) united not only Communists, but also Spaniards of different political alignments – Socialists, Republicans or Anarchists – who the dispersion of their organizations and the silence of their leaders pushed into joining the only fighting structure organised against Nazism".

Popular culture 
 "The Silent War" (2019, original title: Sordo), Spanish movie by Alfonso Cortés-Cavanillas.

See also 
 Spanish Maquis

References

Bibliography 
 
 

October 1944 events
Modern history of Spain
History of Catalonia
Coordinates not on Wikidata
1944 in Spain
Francoist Spain
Invasions of Spain
Military operations involving Spain